Liopropoma  is a genus  of marine ray-finned fish, related to the groupers and included in the subfamily Epinephelinae, part of the family Serranidae, which also includes the anthias and sea basses. They are sometimes seen in the marine aquarium trade.

Species
There are currently 32 recognized species of this genus:
 Liopropoma aberrans Poey, 1860
 Liopropoma africanum J. L. B. Smith, 1954 (African basslet)
 Liopropoma aragai J. E. Randall & L. R. Taylor, 1988
 Liopropoma aurora D. S. Jordan & Evermann, 1903 (Yellowmargin basslet)
 Liopropoma carmabi J. E. Randall, 1963 (Candy basslet)
 Liopropoma collettei J. E. Randall & L. R. Taylor, 1988 (Collette's basslet)
 Liopropoma danae Kotthaus, 1970
 Liopropoma dorsoluteum Kon, Yoshino & Sakurai, 1999
 Liopropoma emanueli Wirtz & Schliewen, 2012 (Cape Verdes basslet)
 Liopropoma erythraeum J. E. Randall & L. R. Taylor, 1988
 Liopropoma eukrines Starck & Courtenay, 1962 (Wrasse bass)
 Liopropoma fasciatum W. A. Bussing, 1980 (Wrasse ass bass)
 Liopropoma flavidum J. E. Randall & L. R. Taylor, 1988
Liopropoma incandescens Pinheiro, Shepherd, Greene & Rocha, 2019
 Liopropoma incomptum J. E. Randall & L. R. Taylor, 1988 (Plain basslet)
 Liopropoma japonicum Döderlein (de), 1883
 Liopropoma latifasciatum S. Tanaka (I), 1922 (Blackstripe basslet)
 Liopropoma lemniscatum J. E. Randall & L. R. Taylor, 1988 (Ribbon basslet)
 Liopropoma longilepis Garman, 1899 (Scalyfin basslet)
 Liopropoma lunulatum Guichenot, 1863
 Liopropoma maculatum Döderlein (de), 1883
 Liopropoma mitratum Lubbock & J. E. Randall, 1978 (Pinstriped basslet)
 Liopropoma mowbrayi Woods & Kanazawa, 1951 (Cave bass)
 Liopropoma multilineatum J. E. Randall & L. R. Taylor, 1988 (Manyline perch)
 Liopropoma olneyi Baldwin & G. D. Johnson, 2014 (Yellow-spotted golden bass) 
 Liopropoma pallidum Fowler, 1938 (Pallid basslet)
 Liopropoma randalli Akhilesh, Bineesh & W. T. White, 2012
 Liopropoma rubre Poey, 1861 (Peppermint bass)
 Liopropoma santi Baldwin & D. R. Robertson, 2014 (Spot-tail golden bass) 
 Liopropoma susumi D. S. Jordan & Seale, 1906 (Meteor perch)
 Liopropoma swalesi Fowler & B. A. Bean, 1930 (Swales's basslet)
 Liopropoma tonstrinum J. E. Randall & L. R. Taylor, 1988 (Redstriped basslet)

Taxonomy
Phylogenetic studies have suggested that the western Atlantic species within the tribe Liopropomini, including the genus Bathyanthias, form a monophyletic group with respect to the Indo-Pacific species currently classified as being within this genus. This further suggests that Bathyanthias is nested within Liopropoma, these studies indicate that more research is needed into the limits of the genus Liopropoma.

References

Liopropomini
Marine fish genera
Taxa named by Theodore Gill